This is a list of films which have placed number one at the weekly box office in Italy during 2012.

References

See also

2012
Box
Italy